George Lott and Anna Harper were the defending champions, but Lott did not compete. Harper partnered with Ian Collins, but lost in the fourth round to Jacques Brugnon and Simonne Mathieu.

Enrique Maier and Elizabeth Ryan defeated Harry Hopman and Josane Sigart in the final, 7–5, 6–2 to win the mixed doubles tennis title at the 1932 Wimbledon Championships.

Seeds

  Ellsworth Vines /  Helen Moody (quarterfinals)
  Henri Cochet /  Eileen Fearnley-Whittingstall (semifinals)
  Jacques Brugnon /  Simonne Mathieu (semifinals)
  Enrique Maier /  Elizabeth Ryan (champions)
  Wilmer Allison /  Helen Jacobs (third round)
  Harry Hopman /  Josane Sigart (final)
  Pat Spence /  Betty Nuthall (quarterfinals)
  Gregory Mangin /  Sarah Palfrey (fourth round)

Draw

Finals

Top half

Section 1

Section 2

Section 3

Section 4

The nationality of Mrs G Hawkins is unknown.

Bottom half

Section 5

Section 6

Section 7

Section 8

References

External links

X=Mixed Doubles
Wimbledon Championship by year – Mixed doubles